Xiawafang Subdistrict is a subdistrict in the northern part of Hexi District, Tianjin. it borders Dawangzhuang and Dazhigu Subdistricts in the northeast, Guajiasi Subdistrict in the south, Taoyuan Subdistrict in the west, and Dayingmen Subdistrict in the northwest. In 2010, its population was 49,767.

Its name Xiawafang originated in late Qing dynasty, when a three-room teahouse was constructed here in the downstream of Hai River, and became popular among the local population.

History

Administrative divisions 
In 2021, Xiawafang Subdistrict was formed from these 10 communities:

Gallery

References 

Township-level divisions of Tianjin
Hexi District, Tianjin